The Palm Beach Handicap is a discontinued American Grade 3 Thoroughbred horse race run between 1937 and 1976 at Hialeah Park Race Track in Hialeah, Florida. Open to horses aged three and older, from inception through 1965 it was run on dirt after which it became a race on turf.

Historical notes
First run on  February 27, 1937, the race was won by Calumet Farm's Count Morse with jockey Irving Anderson aboard.  Following that inaugural running, the Palm Beach Handicap was not held again until 1941, a year frequently reported as its first edition. The final running took place on January 21, 1976 and was won by Sea Lawyer who was ridden by Gerland Gallitano for the Shore View Farm partnership of three Florida medical doctors.

Records
Speed record:
 1:39.80 @ 1-1/16 miles on turf : Star Envoy (1972)
 1:22.00 @ 7 furlongs on dirt: Crafty Admiral (1952) & Pointer (1960)

Most wins:
 2 - Switch On (1956, 1957)
 2 - Point du Jour (1966, 1967)

Most wins by a jockey:
 4 -  Ron Turcotte (1966, 1967, 1969, 1970)

Most wins by a trainer:
 4 - John A. Nerud (1956, 1957, 1962, 1964)

Most wins by an owner:
 2 - Calumet Farm (1937, 1941)
 2 - Greentree Stable (1944, 1949)
 2 - Hasty House Farm (1953, 1973)
 2 - Edith Baily Dent (1966, 1967)
 2 - Emanuel Mittman (1969, 1970)

Winners

References

Graded stakes races in the United States
Discontinued horse races
Turf races in the United States
Horse racing in Florida
Hialeah Park
Widener family
Recurring sporting events established in 1937
Recurring sporting events disestablished in 1976